Martynas Dapkus (born 16 February 1993) is a Lithuanian footballer currently playing at Kauno Žalgiris in Lithuania's A Lyga.

Career
Dapkus is a graduate of the NFA. In 2011 moved to the youth system of FK Atletas Kaunas, and in summer 2011 moved to Maccabi Haifa after the recommendation of former player Raimondas Žutautas bring the player. After one season in the youth loaned to Hapoel Nazareth Illit. For the 2015 season he returned to Lithuania and signed with FC Stumbras, a team with close relations to NFA where he graduated. Before 2016 season, Dapkus moved into Lithuanian vice-champions Trakai, but was released after club lost in Europa League qualification. He agreed to one-year deal with I Lyga winners Šilas before 2017 season, but had to leave the club as it withdrew from the professional football due to match-fixing allegations. Midfielder joined other A Lyga club Jonava.

In January 2019 became the member of FK Kauno Žalgiris.

References

1993 births
Living people
Lithuanian footballers
Lithuania international footballers
Lithuania under-21 international footballers
Lithuanian expatriate footballers
Maccabi Haifa F.C. players
Hapoel Nof HaGalil F.C. players
FC Stumbras players
FK Riteriai players
FK Šilas players
FK Jonava players
Israeli Premier League players
Liga Leumit players
A Lyga players
Expatriate footballers in Israel
Lithuanian expatriate sportspeople in Israel
Association football midfielders
People from Tauragė